Daniel Solomon Dines (born January 1972) is a Romanian billionaire entrepreneur, and the co-founder and CEO of UiPath, a robotic process automation platform. He is nicknamed Boss of the Bots, becoming the first bot billionaire. 

In March 2022, Dines was the wealthiest person in Romania, with an estimated net worth of US$2.9 billion.

Early life
Dines' father was an engineer and his mother a teacher. Dines earned a degree from the University of Bucharest.

Career
Dines worked for Microsoft in Seattle, Washington, US, from 2000 to 2005, then later returned to Romania. Dines started DeskOver in 2005 in Bucharest, Romania, and later renamed it UiPath and moved its headquarters to New York City in 2018. He has stated that he wanted UiPath to be a kind of Romanian Google or Facebook.

Philanthropy
In April 2019, Dines donated €1 million to help rebuild Notre-Dame.

References

External links
 

1972 births
Living people 
People from Onești 
Businesspeople in information technology
University of Bucharest alumni
Romanian technology company founders
Romanian technology chief executives 
Romanian billionaires
Microsoft employees
Romanian expatriates in the United States